Alchermes (from the , from ) is a type of Italian liqueur (especially in Tuscany, Emilia-Romagna and Sicily) prepared by infusing neutral spirits with sugar, cinnamon, cloves, nutmeg and vanilla, and other herbs and flavoring agents. Its most striking characteristic is its scarlet color, obtained by the addition of Kermes, a small scale insect from which the drink derives its name. Several proprietary variants are commercially available, where the coloring agent is a coal tar-derived dye such as E124 or E126, with alcoholic contents ranging from 21 to 32%. Its chief use is in coloring pastry, although a quick dessert is sometimes made by adding it to custard cream and sugar. In the Italian pudding zuppa inglese, sponge cake or ladyfingers soaked in this liqueur are a major ingredient.

Alkermes was a modification of an 8th-century potion confectio alchermes, a tonic composed of raw silk, apple juice, ground pearls, musk, ambergris, gold leaf, rose water, cinnamon, sugar and honey. In pre-modern medicine, it was ranked among the best tonics for the heart, and was frequently used for the palpitation of the heart, or syncope, sometimes for smallpox or measles and a general restorative.

References

Further reading
 Greenfield, Amy Butler: Alkermes "Liqueur of Prodigious Strength" Gastronomica. 2007 Winter; 7(1):25-30.

History of pharmacy
Italian liqueurs